The 2008 Swiss Figure Skating Championships (officially named  and ) were held at the Eishalle Deutweg in Winterthur from December 7 through 8th, 2007. Medals were awarded in the disciplines of men's singles, ladies' singles, pair skating, and ice dancing.

Senior results

Men

Ladies

Pairs

Ice dancing

Junior results

Ice dancing

Novice results

Ice dancing

External links
 2008 Swiss Championships results

Swiss Figure Skating Championships
2007 in figure skating
Swiss Figure Skating Championships, 2008